Andrew Henry Vachss (October 19, 1942 – November 23, 2021) was an American crime fiction author, child protection consultant, and attorney exclusively representing children and youths.

Early life and career 
Vachss grew up in Manhattan on the Lower West Side. Before becoming a lawyer, Vachss held many front-line positions in child protection. He was a federal investigator in sexually transmitted diseases, and a New York City social-services caseworker.  He worked in Biafra, entering the war zone just before the fall of the country. There he worked to find a land route to bring donated food and medical supplies across the border after the seaports were blocked and Red Cross airlifts banned by the Nigerian government; however, all attempts ultimately failed, resulting in rampant starvation.

After he returned and recovered from his injuries, including malaria and malnutrition, Vachss studied community organizing in 1970 under Saul Alinsky. He worked as a labor organizer and ran a self-help center for urban migrants in Chicago.  He then managed a re-entry program for ex-convicts in Massachusetts, and finally directed a maximum-security prison for violent juvenile offenders.

As an attorney, Vachss represented only children and adolescents. In addition to his private practice, he served as a law guardian in New York state. In every child abuse or neglect case, state law requires the appointment of a law guardian, a lawyer who represents the child's interests during the legal proceedings.

Writings 
Andrew Vachss was the author of 33 novels and three collections of short stories, as well as poetry, plays, song lyrics, and graphic novels.
As a novelist, he was perhaps best known for his Burke series of hardboiled mysteries; Another Life constituted the finale to the series.

After completing the Burke novels, Vachss began two new series. Vachss released the first novel in the Dell & Dolly trilogy, entitled Aftershock, in 2013. The second novel, Shockwave, was released in 2014, and Signwave, the final book, was published in June 2015. Departing from Vachss' familiar urban settings, the trilogy focuses on Dell, a former soldier and assassin, and Dolly, a former nurse with Doctors Without Borders and the love of Dell's life. While living in the Pacific Northwest, Dell and Dolly use their war-honed skills to maintain a "heads on stakes" barrier against the predators who use their everyday positions in the community as camouflage in order to attack the vulnerable.

The Cross series uses distinctive supernatural aspects to further explore Vachss' argument that society's failure to protect its children is the greatest threat to the human species. In 2012, Vachss' published Blackjack: A Cross Novel, featuring the mercenary Cross Crew, introduced in earlier Vachss short stories as Chicago's most-feared criminal gang. Urban Renewal, the second novel in the Cross series, came out in 2014. The third in the series, Drawing Dead, was released in 2016.

In addition to the Aftershock, Burke, and Cross series, Vachss wrote several stand-alone works. The first novel he published outside the Burke series was Shella. Released in 1993, Shella was the most polarizing of his works in terms of critical response.  Vachss often referred to Shella as his "beloved orphan"  until the 2004 release of The Getaway Man, a tribute to the Gold Medal paperback originals of the 1960s. In 2005, Vachss released the epic Two Trains Running, a novel which takes place entirely during a two-week span in 1959, a critical period in American history. In form, Two Trains Running presents as a work composed entirely of transcribed surveillance tapes, akin to a collage film constructed only of footage from a single source. His 2009 novel, Haiku, focuses on the troubled lives of a band of homeless men in New York City, struggling to connect with and protect each other. In 2010, Vachss published two books: his novel The Weight, is a noir romance involving a professional thief and a young widow in hiding. Heart Transplant, an illustrated novel in an experimental design, tells the story of an abused and bullied young boy who finds his inner strength with the help of an unexpected mentor. That's How I Roll, released in 2012, chronicles the death-row narrative of a hired killer as he reveals the secrets of his past, both horrifying and tender.

Vachss collaborated on works with authors Jim Colbert (Cross, 1995) and Joe R. Lansdale (Veil's Visit, 1999). He also created illustrated works with artists Frank Caruso (Heart Transplant, 2010) and Geof Darrow (Another Chance to Get It Right, 1993; The Shaolin Cowboy Adventure Magazine, 2014). Vachss' graphic novel, Underground, was released in November 2014.

Vachss also wrote non-fiction, including numerous articles and essays on child protection and a book on juvenile criminology. His books have been translated into 20 languages, and his shorter works have appeared in many publications, including Parade, Antaeus, Esquire, Playboy, and The New York Times. Vachss' literary awards include the Grand Prix de Littérature Policière for Strega [as La Sorcière de Brooklyn]; the Falcon Award, Maltese Falcon Society of Japan, for Strega; the Deutscher Krimi Preis for Flood [as Kata]; and the Raymond Chandler Award for his body of work.

Andrew Vachss was a member of PEN and the Writers Guild of America. His autobiographical essay was added by invitation to Contemporary Authors in 2003.

Child protection 
Many of Vachss' novels feature the shadowy, unlicensed investigator Burke, an ex-con, career criminal, and deeply conflicted character.  About his protagonist, Vachss said:

Vachss coined the phrase "Children of the Secret", which refers to abused children, of whatever age, who were victimized without ever experiencing justice, much less love and protection. In the Burke novels, some of these Children of the Secret have banded together as adults into what Vachss called a "family of choice". Their connection is not biological, and they form very loyal bonds. Most are career criminals; none allows the law to come before the duty to family.

Vachss originated the term "Circle of Trust." which has since entered general circulation. Vachss coined the term to combat the mistaken over-emphasis on "stranger danger," a bias that prevents society from focusing on the most common way children are accessed for victimization:

Another term Vachss originated is "Transcenders."

Dogs 
Another important theme that pervades Vachss' work is his love of dogs, particularly breeds considered "dangerous," such as Doberman pinschers, rottweilers, and especially pit bulls. Throughout his writings, Vachss asserted that with dogs, just as with humans, "you get what you raise."

He was a passionate advocate against animal abuse such as dog-fighting, and against breed-specific legislative bans. With fellow crime writer James Colbert, Vachss trained dogs to serve as therapy dogs for abused children. The dogs have a calming effect on traumatized children. Vachss noted that using these particular breeds further increases the victims' feelings of security; their "dangerous" appearance, in combination with the extensive therapy training, makes them excellent protection against human threats. During her time as chief prosecutor, Alice Vachss regularly brought one such trained dog, Sheba, to work with abused children being interviewed at the Special Victims Bureau.

Personal life
When Vachss was 7 years old, an older boy swung a chain at his right eye. The resulting injuries damaged the eye muscles and resulted in his wearing an eyepatch. According to Vachss, removing it had the effect of a strobe light flashing in his face. Vachss also had a small blue heart tattooed on his right hand.

Vachss' wife, Alice, was a sex crimes prosecutor, and she later became Chief of the Special Victims Bureau in Queens, New York. She is the author of the nonfiction book Sex Crimes: Ten Years on the Front Lines Prosecuting Rapists and Confronting Their Collaborators, a New York Times Notable Book of the Year. She has continued her work as Special Prosecutor for Sex Crimes in rural Oregon.

He died of coronary artery disease on November 23, 2021, at the age of 79 at his residence in Pacific Northwest.

Honors and awards

Professional honors and awards 

A/V Peer Review (highest rating) by Martindale-Hubbell
2004, LL.D. (Hon.) Case Western Reserve University 
2003, First Annual Harvey R. Houck Award (Justice for Children)
2003, First Annual Illuminations Award (St. Vincent's Center National Child Abuse Prevention Program)
1994, Childhelp Congressional Award 
1976, John Hay Whitney Foundation Fellow
1970, Industrial Areas Foundation Training Institute Fellow

Literary honors and awards 

2000, Raymond Chandler Award, Giurìa a Noir in Festival, Courmayeur, Italy, for body of writing 
1989, Deutscher Krimi Preis, Die Jury des Bochumer Krimi Archivs, Germany, for Flood (as Kata)
1989, Maltese Falcon Award, Japan, for Strega
1988, Grand Prix de Littérature Policière, France, for Strega (as La Sorciere de Brooklyn)

Bibliography

The Burke series 
Flood (1985)
Strega (1987)
Blue Belle (1988)
Hard Candy (1989)
Blossom (1990)
Sacrifice (1991)
Down in the Zero (1994)
Footsteps of the Hawk (1995)
False Allegations (1996)
Safe House (1998)
Choice of Evil (1999)
Dead and Gone (2000)
Pain Management (2001)
Only Child (2002)
Down Here (2004)
Mask Market (2006)
Terminal (2007)
Another Life (2008)

The Cross series 

Blackjack: A Cross Novel (2012)
Urban Renewal: A Cross Novel (2014)
Drawing Dead: A Cross Novel (2016)

The Aftershock trilogy 

Aftershock (2013)
Shockwave (2014)
Signwave (2015)

Other novels 

Shella (1993)
Batman: The Ultimate Evil (1995)
The Getaway Man (2003)
Two Trains Running (2005)
Haiku (2009)
The Weight (2010)
A Bomb Built in Hell (2012)
That's How I Roll (2012)
Carbon (2019)
Blood Line (2022)

Novelettes 

The Questioner (2018)

Short story collections 

Born Bad (1994)
Everybody Pays (1999)
Proving It (2001) audiobook collection.
Dog Stories – online collection.
Mortal Lock (2013)

Comic books and graphic novels 

Hard Looks (1992–93) – ten-issue series.
Andrew Vachss' Underground (1993-1994) – four-issue series of illustrated and non-illustrated short stories. Contains Vachss' "Underground" stories (that are also featured in Born Bad), as well as stories by other authors that exist within Vachss' "Underground" world.
Batman: The Ultimate Evil (1995) – two-issue adaptation of the novel.
Cross (1995) – seven-issue series with James Colbert.
Predator: Race War (1993) – five-issue series; (1995) collected edition.
Alamaailma (1997) – Finnish graphic novel, illustrating two of the "Underground" short stories from Born Bad.
Hard Looks (1996, 2002) – trade paperback.
Another Chance To Get It Right: A Children's Book for Adults (1993, 1995) (reprinted with additional material and new cover, 2003, 2016)
Heart Transplant (2010)
Underground (2014)

Plays 
Placebo (in Antaeus, 1991)
Warlord (in Born Bad, 1994)
Replay (in Born Bad, 1994)

Non-fiction 
The Life-Style Violent Juvenile: The Secure Treatment Approach (Lexington, 1979)
The Child Abuse-Delinquency Connection — A Lawyer's View (Lexington, 1989)
Parade Magazine articles (1985–2006)

See also 

Child pornography
Child sexual abuse
Emotional abuse

References

External links 

 , The Zero
 KBOO Portland radio interview
 The Cult interview by Rob W. Hart
 The Independent (Ireland) interview by Ian O'Doherty
Interview of Andrew Vachss on his final Burke novel

1942 births
2021 deaths
20th-century American novelists
21st-century American novelists
American crime fiction writers
American graphic novelists
American legal writers
American male novelists
Bob Clampett Humanitarian Award winners
Case Western Reserve University alumni
Child abuse
Lawyers from New York City
Maltese Falcon Award winners
Writers from Manhattan
American male essayists
People of the Nigerian Civil War
American expatriates in Nigeria
American male short story writers
20th-century American short story writers
21st-century American short story writers
21st-century American essayists
20th-century American male writers
21st-century American male writers
Novelists from New York (state)
20th-century American essayists